Tepehuanes may refer to:
 Tepehuanes Municipality
 Santa Catarina de Tepehuanes, municipal seat of the municipality
 Tepehuanes River
 Tepehuán people
 Tepehuán language

Language and nationality disambiguation pages